The Sir Trevor Dawson was an American-built Canadian bulk carrier that operated from 1916 to 1970 on the Great Lakes. She was launched on September 9, 1916 as hull #524. She was built by the Superior Shipbuilding Company of Superior, Wisconsin using the stern of the wrecked bulk freighter . She was powered by a 2,000 hp triple expansion steam engine, supplied by two coal-fired Scotch marine boilers. The Dawson'''s first owner was the American Interlake Company. Her homeport was Duluth, Minnesota. She entered service in December 1916 carrying a load of grain to Duluth, Minnesota

New name and a new company
On December 16, 1920 the Dawson was sold to the Pioneer Steamship Company of Cleveland, Ohio. Later that year she was renamed Charles L. Hutchinson. The Hutchinson stranded on the Keweenaw Peninsula on October 31, 1925 (near where the William C Moreland wrecked). She was removed by the wrecking tugs Favorite and Iowa. In 1932 she was re-registered to Wilmington, Delaware. She was renamed Gene C. Hutchinson in 1951. In 1962 the Hutchinson was sold to Redwood Enterprises Ltd. of Port Credit and renamed Parkdale.

Tow to Spain

In 1970 the Parkdale was sold to the Marine Salvage Ltd. of Port Colborne. Eventually she was sold to a Spanish scrapyard. On May 12, 1970 she cleared Quebec with the Alexander Leslie, towe by the tug Salvonia''. They arrived in Cartagena, Spain on June 8, 1970.

See also
Sir Trevor Dawson, English managing director of Vickers armaments

References

1916 ships
Great Lakes freighters
Merchant ships of the United States
Maritime incidents in 1925
Ships powered by a triple expansion steam engine
Ships built in Superior, Wisconsin